Víctor Suárez may refer to:
 Víctor Suárez Carrera (born 1952), Mexican politician
 Víctor Suárez Meléndez, current Puerto Rico Secretary of State